The Spanish government has had 61 women as ministers throughout history. Only one woman, Federica Montseny, has held the post of minister before the current democratic period, becoming one of the first female ministers in the whole Europe. The second government of José Luis Rodríguez Zapatero (PSOE) was the first to achieve full equality, with the same number of male and female ministers. The current government of Pedro Sánchez holds the record for the biggest amount of female ministers, with 14, whilst his first government became the first one to have more women than men.

Political party table

Female ministers

Second Spanish Republic

Current democratic period (since 1978) 

  refers to the first woman in that specific ministry.
  refers to current ministers of the Government.

Timeline since 1981

See also 

 Politics of Spain
 Council of Ministers (Spain)

References

Politics of Spain